"The Morning After" is a song written by Al Kasha and Joel Hirschhorn for the 1972 film The Poseidon Adventure, winning Best Original Song at the 45th Academy Awards. Following this success, Maureen McGovern recorded a single version that became a No. 1 hit in the US for two weeks during August 1973, with Gold record sales. Billboard ranked it as the No. 28 song for 1973.

Beginnings
The song was written in March 1972 by 20th Century Fox songwriters Al Kasha and Joel Hirschhorn, who were asked to write the love theme for The Poseidon Adventure in one night. The finished product was called "Why Must There Be a Morning After?" but changes by the record label resulted in the more optimistic lyric "there's got to be a morning after". 

In the film the song is performed by the character of Nonnie, played by Carol Lynley, but actually sung by the vocal double Renee Armand. It appears twice: during a warm-up rehearsal and then later during the New Year's Eve party early in the film, before the passengers must escape the sinking wreck. The title appears in the end credits as "The Song from The Poseidon Adventure".

Personnel
 Maureen McGovern - vocals
 Joe Hudson - arrangement, conductor
 Bob Fraser - guitar
 Bill Severance - drums, percussion

Chart performance

Weekly charts

Year-end charts

Certifications

See also
 List of Billboard Hot 100 number-one singles of 1973
 List of number-one singles in Australia during the 1970s

References

External links
 

1972 songs
1973 singles
1970s ballads
20th Century Fox Records singles
Pop ballads
Best Original Song Academy Award-winning songs
Billboard Hot 100 number-one singles
Love themes
Maureen McGovern songs
Number-one singles in Australia
Songs written for films
Songs written by Al Kasha
Songs written by Joel Hirschhorn
Film theme songs